The 1961 Soviet Cup was an association football cup competition of the Soviet Union.

Competition schedule

Preliminary stage

Group 1 (Russian Federation)

Semifinals
 METALLURG Cherepovets         2-1  Onezhets Petrozavodsk 
 SHINNIK Yaroslavl             4-2  Sputnik Kaluga 
 Trud Tula                     1-2  DINAMO Bryansk  
 VOLGA Kalinin                 5-0  Dinamo Leningrad

Final
 Dinamo Bryansk                0-1  METALLURG Cherepovets  
 SPARTAK Leningrad             3-1  Tralflotovets Murmansk 
 Textilshchik Kostroma         0-2  SHAKHTYOR Stalinogorsk 
 Volga Kalinin                 0-0  Shinnik Yaroslavl

Final replays
 VOLGA Kalinin                 3-2  Shinnik Yaroslavl             [aet]

Group 2 (Russian Federation)

Semifinals
 Baltika Kaliningrad           1-1  Torpedo Gorkiy 
 DINAMO Kirov                  5-2  Znamya Truda Orekhovo-Zuyevo  [aet] 
 ISKRA Kazan                   2-0  Spartak Smolensk 
 ZENIT Izhevsk                 3-0  Textilshchik Ivanovo

Semifinals replays
 BALTIKA Kaliningrad           2-0  Torpedo Gorkiy

Final
 BALTIKA Kaliningrad           3-0  Dinamo Kirov 
 ISKRA Kazan                   2-0  Zenit Izhevsk 
 MVO Serpukhov                 2-1  Trud Noginsk                  [aet] 
 RAKETA Gorkiy                 2-0  Traktor Vladimir

Group 3 (Russian Federation)

Semifinals
 ENERGIYA Volzhskiy            4-2  Lokomotiv Oryol 
 Neftyanik Syzran              1-2  TRAKTOR Stalingrad 
 SPARTAK Ryazan                2-0  Torpedo Lipetsk 
 Spartak Ulyanovsk             1-1  Sokol Saratov 
 Zarya Penza                   0-7  KRYLYA SOVETOV Kuibyshev

Semifinals replays
 SPARTAK Ulyanovsk             4-2  Sokol Saratov

Final
 ENERGIYA Volzhskiy            3-1  Spartak Ulyanovsk 
 KRYLYA SOVETOV Kuibyshev      5-0  Spartak Tambov 
 TRAKTOR Stalingrad            3-1  Spartak Ryazan 
 TRUDOVIYE REZERVY Kursk       3-2  Cementnik Belgorod

Group 4 (Russian Federation)

Semifinals
 SPARTAK Orjonikidze           2-0  Cement Novorossiysk 
 Spartak Stavropol             1-1  Torpedo Armavir  
 TORPEDO Taganrog              2-0  Terek Grozny 
 VOLGAR Astrakhan              2-0  Trudoviye Rezervy Kislovodsk

Semifinals replays
 Spartak Stavropol             0-1  TORPEDO Armavir

Final
 SHAKHTYOR Shakhty             4-1  RostSelMash Rostov-na-Donu 
 SPARTAK Nalchik               1-0  Dinamo Makhachkala 
 Spartak Orjonikidze           0-1  TORPEDO Armavir  
 TORPEDO Taganrog              1-0  Volgar Astrakhan

Group 5 (Russian Federation)

Semifinals
 GEOLOG Tyumen                 3-1  Stroitel Saransk 
 IRTYSH Omsk                   1-0  UralMash Sverdlovsk 
 LOKOMOTIV Orenburg            3-1  Metallurg Magnitogorsk 
 STROITEL Ufa                  2-0  Metallurg Nizhniy Tagil 
 ZVEZDA Perm                   2-0  Stroitel Kurgan

Final
 IRTYSH Omsk                   2-0  Geolog Tyumen                 [aet] 
 KHIMIK Berezniki              2-1  Lokomotiv Chelyabinsk 
 TORPEDO Pavlovo               2-0  Lokomotiv Orenburg 
 Zvezda Perm                   3-5  STROITEL Ufa                  [aet]

Group 6 (Russian Federation)

Semifinals
 AMUR Blagoveshchensk          4-2  Avangard Komsomolsk-na-Amure  [aet] 
 SKA Khabarovsk                1-1  SKA Novosibirsk 
 TEMP Barnaul                  1-0  Baykal Ulan-Ude 
 TOMICH Tomsk                  3-1  Angara Irkutsk 
 Zabaikalets Chita             1-1  Khimik Kemerovo

Semifinals replays
 SKA Khabarovsk                2-0  SKA Novosibirsk 
 Zabaikalets Chita             0-0  Khimik Kemerovo 
 ZABAIKALETS Chita             3-2  Khimik Kemerovo

Final
 AMUR Blagoveshchensk          2-1  Zabaikalets Chita 
 LUCH Vladivostok              3-0  Lokomotiv Krasnoyarsk 
 METALLURG Stalinsk            5-0  Temp Barnaul 
 SKA Khabarovsk                2-0  Tomich Tomsk

Group 1 (Ukraine)

Semifinals
 [Jun 8] 
 ZVEZDA Kirovograd             2-1  Avangard Chernovtsy 
 [Jun 10] 
 CHERNOMORETS Odessa           3-2  Kolhospnik Rovno 
 [Jun 11] 
 Avangard Ternopol             1-2  SPARTAK Stanislav  
 DESNA Chernigov               4-3  Neftyanik Drogobych 
 KOLHOSPNIK Cherkassy          3-2  Sudostroitel Nikolayev 
 Polesye Zhitomir              1-1  Dinamo Khmelnitskiy 
 SKA Lvov                      2-0  Arsenal Kiev 
 VERKHOVINA Uzhgorod           3-1  Volyn Lutsk

Semifinals replays
 [Jun 12] 
 Polesye Zhitomir              0-2  DINAMO Khmelnitskiy

Final
 [May 9] 
 LOKOMOTIV Vinnitsa            2-1  Mayak Kherson 
 [Jun 21] 
 Zvezda Kirovograd             2-3  CHERNOMORETS Odessa  
 [Jun 30] 
 SKA Lvov                      3-4  DINAMO Khmelnitskiy 
 [Jul 2] 
 KOLGOSPNIK Cherkassy          2-1  Verkhovina Uzhgorod 
 Spartak Stanislav             0-0  Desna Chernigov

Final replays
 SPARTAK Stanislav             1-0  Desna Chernigov

Group 2 (Ukraine)

Semifinals
 [Jun 10] 
 Avangard Krivoi Rog           2-2  Avangard Sumy 
 AZOVSTAL Zhdanov              1-0  Metallurg Zaporozhye 
 SKF Sevastopol                3-0  SKA Kiev 
 [Jun 11] 
 AVANGARD Simferopol           2-0  Shakhtyor Kadiyevka 
 Kolgospnik Poltava            1-2  AVANGARD Kramatorsk  
 Metallurg Dnepropetrovsk      1-2  LOKOMOTIV Stalino 
 SKA Odessa                    0-1  AVANGARD Zholtyye Vody 
 TORPEDO Kharkov               2-0  Shakhtyor Gorlovka

Semifinals replays
 Avangard Krivoi Rog           2-3  AVANGARD Sumy

Final
 [Jun 10] 
 KHIMIK Severodonetsk          3-0  Khimik Dneprodzerzhinsk 
 [Jun 18] 
 SKF Sevastopol                1-0  Avangard Sumy 
 [Jul 2] 
 AVANGARD Kramatorsk           1-0  AzovStal Zhdanov              [aet] 
 AVANGARD Simferopol           2-0  Torpedo Kharkov 
 [Jul 4] 
 Lokomotiv Stalino             0-1  AVANGARD Zholtyye Vody

Group 1 (Union republics)

Semifinals
 Khimik Mogilyov               0-4  SPARTAK Brest 
 Lokomotiv Gomel               0-3  LOKOMOTIV Tbilisi

Final
 Krasnoye Znamya Vitebsk       2-2  Dinamo Batumi 
 LOKOMOTIV Tbilisi             w/o  REZ Riga 
 SelMash Liepaja               0-1  NISTRUL Bendery 
 SPARTAK Brest                 w/o  Ritsa Sukhumi

Final replays
 Krasnoye Znamya Vitebsk       1-1  Dinamo Batumi 
 Krasnoye Znamya Vitebsk       3-6  DINAMO Batumi

Group 2 (Union republics)

Semifinals
 START Tashkent                2-0  Dinamo Samarkand 
 TEXTILSHCHIK Kirovabad        w/o  Metallurg Chimkent 
 TORPEDO Kutaisi               3-0  Spartak Baku

Final
 ENERGETIK Stalinabad          4-1  Kopet-Dag Ashkhabad 
 Metallurg Rustavi             1-3  TORPEDO Kutaisi 
 SPARTAK Fergana               1-0  Temp Sumgait 
 START Tashkent                w/o  Textilshchik Kirovabad

Final stage

First round
 [Jun 21] 
 Luch Vladivostok              1-2  DINAMO Moskva 
   [G.Yepishin 7 – Genrikh Fedosov 9, Valeriy Korolenkov 82 pen] 
 [Jun 23] 
 ENERGETIK Stalinabad          5-1  Daugava Riga 
   [E.Astvatsaturov-3, B.Semyonov, V.Gurko - ?] 
 [Jun 28] 
 Chernomorets Odessa           1-2  DINAMO Kiev 
   [Nikolai Molochkov 15 – Valentin Troyanovskiy 9 pen, Yozhef Sabo 32] 
 [Jun 30] 
 Khimik Berezniki              1-2  SPARTAK Fergana 
 Nistrul Bendery               0-4  KRYLYA SOVETOV Kuibyshev 
 SPARTAK Leningrad             2-0  CSKA Moskva 
   [Makeyev 18, Vasilenko ?] 
 Traktor Stalingrad            0-3  DINAMO Tbilisi 
   [Vladimir Barkaia, Shota Yamanidze, Ilya Datunashvili] 
 [Jul 2] 
 Lokomotiv Vinnitsa            0-1  SPARTAK Yerevan 
 [Jul 15] 
 AVANGARD Kramatorsk           1-0  Avangard Simferopol 
   [Dotsenko pen] 
 Irtysh Omsk                   0-1  NEFTYANIK Baku 
 RAKETA Gorkiy                 1-0  Moldova Kishinev 
 TORPEDO Armavir               1-0  Avangard Zholtyye Vody 
 Torpedo Kutaisi               0-1  KOLHOSPNIK Cherkassy 
   [Vulfovich] 
 TORPEDO Pavlovo               2-1  Dinamo Batumi 
 Volga Kalinin                 2-3  KALEV Tallinn 
 [Jul 19] 
 Metallurg Cherepovets         2-3  BELARUS Minsk 
   [? – Mikhail Mustygin, Vladimir Terekhov, Ivan Mozer] 
 [Jul 22] 
 Torpedo Taganrog              1-2  TORPEDO Moskva 
   [V.Fisenko – Gennadiy Gusarov-2] 
 [Jul 23] 
 Spartak Nalchik               0-2  SKA Rostov-na-Donu 
   [Vladimir Streshniy-2] 
 [Jul 28] 
 SKF Sevastopol                1-0  Spartak Vilnius 
   [Skripka] 
 [Jul 30] 
 Dinamo Khmelnitskiy           0-2  SHAKHTYOR Stalino 
   [Valentin Sapronov ?, Vitaliy Savelyev 68] 
 [Aug 3] 
 TRUDOVIYE REZERVY Kursk       3-1  Spartak Brest 
   [Val.Batin-2, S.Rybkin – V.Statsyuk] 
 [Aug 4] 
 ISKRA Kazan                   2-0  Trud Voronezh 
   [Anatoliy Kashurin, Leonid Dardymov] 
 [Aug 9] 
 SKA Khabarovsk                1-2  AVANGARD Kharkov 
   [V.Myazin – Nikolai Korolyov, Yuriy Nesterov] 
 [Aug 15] 
 Amur Blagoveshchensk          0-6  PAHTAKOR Tashkent 
 Lokomotiv Tbilisi             0-1  LOKOMOTIV Moskva 
   [Viktor Voroshilov 25] 
 METALLURG Stalinsk            1-0  Kayrat Alma-Ata               [aet] 
 MVO Serpukhov                 1-0  Baltika Kaliningrad 
 Shakhtyor Shakhty             1-4  ADMIRALTEYETS Leningrad 
 SHAKHTYOR Stalinogorsk        1-0  Khimik Severodonetsk 
 Spartak Stanislav             0-1  ENERGIYA Volzhskiy 
   [Suchilin] 
 [Aug 19] 
 Start Tashkent                0-0  Spartak Moskva 
 [Aug 23] 
 Stroitel Ufa                  0-2  ZENIT Leningrad 
   [Stanislav Zavidonov 19, Lev Burchalkin 87]

First round replays
 [Aug 20] 
 Start Tashkent                0-2  SPARTAK Moskva 
   [Galimzyan Husainov 15, Yuriy Sevidov 58]

Second round
 [Aug 10] 
 Energetik Stalinabad          1-2  SHAKHTYOR Stalinogorsk 
   [Khlebnikov – Buda-2] 
 Spartak Fergana               0-3  SHAKHTYOR Stalino 
   [Yuriy Zakharov 38, 53, Valentin Sapronov ?] 
 [Aug 14] 
 Dinamo Moskva                 0-0  Iskra Kazan 
 KRYLYA SOVETOV Kuibyshev      1-0  Belarus Minsk  
   [Anatoliy Kazakov] 
 [Aug 20] 
 Admiralteyets Leningrad       2-2  MVO Serpukhov 
   [? – Silkin-2] 
 Energiya Volzhskiy            1-5  LOKOMOTIV Moskva 
   [Chirkov – Viktor Sokolov-3, Vyacheslav Spiridonov, Ivan Abramov] 
 Spartak Yerevan               1-3  SKA Rostov-na-Donu 
   [Georgiy Shaginyan – A.Volchenkov-2, Vladimir Andriyenko] 
 [Aug 23] 
 SPARTAK Moskva                4-0  SKF Sevastopol 
   [Yuriy Sevidov-2, Galimzyan Husainov, Leonard Adamov] 
 [Aug 26] 
 TORPEDO Moskva                8-0  Trudoviye Rezervy Kursk 
   [Valentin Ivanov-3, Gennadiy Gusarov-3, Valentin Denisov, Oleg Sergeyev] 
 [Sep 9] 
 Kolhospnik Cherkassy          0-1  ZENIT Leningrad 
   [Vyacheslav Krotkov 18] 
 METALLURG Stalinsk            3-0  Pahtakor Tashkent 
 NEFTYANIK Baku                2-1  Kalev Tallinn 
   [Robert Chanchaleishvili, Vyacheslav Semiglazov – Arvo Tamkirv] 
 SPARTAK Leningrad             6-0  Torpedo Armavir 
 TORPEDO Pavlovo               3-0  Raketa Gorkiy 
 [Sep 11] 
 DINAMO Kiev                   3-2  Avangard Kramatorsk           [aet] 
   [Oleg Bazilevich 75, ?, Vasiliy Turyanchik 87 – Dotsenko 45, Drygala 83] 
 [Sep 23] 
 DINAMO Tbilisi                2-1  Avangard Kharkov 
   [Tengiz Melashvili 73, Mikhail Meskhi 80 – Yuriy Nesterov 88]

Second round replays
 [Aug 15] 
 DINAMO Moskva                 8-0  Iskra Kazan 
   [Igor Chislenko 15, Valeriy Fadeyev 22, Viktor Anichkin 29, 63, Valeriy Korolenkov 52, 83, Kazhurin (I) 57 og, Arkadiy Nikolayev 87] 
 [Aug 21] 
 ADMIRALTEYETS Leningrad       3-2  MVO Serpukhov 
   [Yuriy Varlamov-2, Sergei Sogomonyants – Feflov, Oreshnikov]

Third round
 [Aug 20] 
 SHAKHTYOR Stalinogorsk        2-0  Dinamo Moskva 
   [Plekhanov 41, Lopukhin 67] 
 [Aug 25] 
 LOKOMOTIV Moskva              4-0  Metallurg Stalinsk 
   [Ivan Abramov 5, Vyacheslav Simeoshin 23, Viktor Sokolov 51, 70] 
 [Sep 12] 
 TORPEDO Moskva                3-0  Spartak Leningrad 
   [Valentin Ivanov-2, Slava Metreveli] 
 [Sep 23] 
 ADMIRALTEYETS Leningrad       2-1  Dinamo Kiev 
   [Vladimir Vinogradov 25, Eduard Belkin 63 – Vladimir Levchenko 69] 
 [Oct 3] 
 ZENIT Leningrad               3-0  Krylya Sovetov Kuibyshev 
   [Vadim Khrapovitskiy 31, 49, Nikolai Ryazanov 33] 
 [Oct 8] 
 SHAKHTYOR Stalino             3-2  Dinamo Tbilisi 
   [Yuriy Zakharov 33, 76, Yuriy Ananchenko 54 – Zaur Kaloyev 10, Mikhail Meskhi 53] 
 SKA Rostov-na-Donu            2-2  Spartak Moskva 
   [Gennadiy Matveyev 9, Vladimir Streshniy 88 – Leonard Adamov 47, Galimzyan Husainov 57 pen] 
 Torpedo Pavlovo               0-0  Neftyanik Baku

Third round replays
 [Oct 9] 
 SKA Rostov-na-Donu            2-0  Spartak Moskva 
   [Yuriy Mosalyov 17, 73] 
 Torpedo Pavlovo               1-3  NEFTYANIK Baku 
   [Belov – Adamas Golodets, Yuriy Kuznetsov, Kyamil Eynullayev]

Quarterfinals
 [Oct 9] 
 Lokomotiv Moskva              0-1  ADMIRALTEYETS Leningrad 
   [Valentin Gusev 31] 
 [Oct 14] 
 SKA Rostov-na-Donu            2-3  TORPEDO Moskva 
   [Viktor Ponedelnik 73, Gennadiy Matveyev 85 – Gennadiy Gusarov 12, Valentin Ivanov 32, Valentin Denisov 66] 
 [Oct 17] 
 ZENIT Leningrad               2-1  Neftyanik Baku                [aet] 
   [Vasiliy Danilov, Nikolai Ryazanov (ot) – Yuriy Kuznetsov] 
 [Oct 18] 
 SHAKHTYOR Stalino             3-1 Shakhtyor Stalinogorsk 
   [Yuriy Ananchenko 26, 90, Valentin Sapronov 69 – V.Plekhanov 80 pen]

Semifinals
 [Oct 25, Moskva] 
 SHAKHTYOR Stalino             3-0  Admiralteyets Leningrad  
   [Oleg Kolosov 34, Yuriy Zakharov 68, 73] 
 [Oct 26] 
 TORPEDO Moskva                2-0  Zenit Leningrad 
   [Valentin Ivanov 6, Slava Metreveli 63]

Final

External links
 Complete calendar. helmsoccer.narod.ru
 1961 Soviet Cup. Footballfacts.ru
 1961 Soviet football season. RSSSF

Soviet Cup seasons
Cup
Soviet Cup
Soviet Cup